Since Netherlands' first One Day International (ODI) in 1996, 82 players have represented the team. A One Day International (ODI) is an international cricket match between two representative teams, each having ODI status, as determined by the International Cricket Council (ICC). An ODI differs from Test matches in that the number of overs per team is limited, and that each team has only one innings. The list is arranged in the order in which each player won his first ODI cap. Where more than one player won his first ODI cap in the same match, those players are listed alphabetically by surname.

Key

Players
Statistics are correct as of 21 August 2022.

Notes

See also
One Day International
Netherlands national cricket team
List of Netherlands Twenty20 International cricketers
List of Netherlands first-class cricketers
Dutch national cricket captains

References

External links
Howstat
Cricinfo

Netherlands ODI
ODI cricketers